Coryphopterus kuna, the Kuna goby, is a species of goby found in the Western Atlantic Ocean along the coasts of Panama and Mexico.  

Etymology
The fish is named for the Kuna indigenous people of the Kuna Yala, which is the region of Atlantic Panama in which the holotype was collected, and in recognition of their help with marine biological research.

References

Gobiidae
Fish of the Atlantic Ocean
Fish described in 2007
Taxa named by Benjamin C. Victor